Anthony Fantano (born October 28, 1985) is an American music critic and YouTuber who runs the YouTube channel The Needle Drop and its tie-in website. He discusses and reviews music from a variety of genres in his YouTube videos and on his website.

Early life 
Fantano spent his teenage years in Wolcott, Connecticut. As a teenager, Fantano became interested in politics through the work of the musician Jello Biafra, former lead singer of the punk band Dead Kennedys, calling him "pretty much my political idol". Fantano graduated from Southern Connecticut State University with a degree in liberal studies in 2008.

Career 
Fantano started his career in the mid-2000s as a music director for the Southern Connecticut State University college radio station. In 2007, Fantano started working at Connecticut Public Radio (WNPR), where he hosted The Needle Drop. That same year, he launched The Needle Drop in the form of written reviews, eventually launching his series of video reviews on the YouTube channel of the same name in January 2009, starting with a Jay Reatard record. Fantano has said that his review for Flying Lotus' 2010 album Cosmogramma appearing next to other Flying Lotus videos in YouTube's "Featured Videos" section gave him the "hint" to continue making video reviews. In 2010, Fantano removed older reviews that contained music clips in order to avoid violations of the Digital Millennium Copyright Act. At the time, he was working on The Needle Drop at the college radio station, as well as at a pizza restaurant. In late 2011, he decided to pursue The Needle Drop full-time, but kept affiliation with WNPR until 2014. Fantano was offered an album review show on Adult Swim but declined.

In order to earn enough money to pay his editor Austin Walsh, by November 2016, Fantano had recorded more regularly on a secondary YouTube channel, "thatistheplan", on which he reviewed memes and recorded "often irreverent videos that don't fall into the record review format", according to Spin. This secondary channel came into question and controversy in October 2017, when an article published in The Fader accused Fantano of promoting alt-right sentiments in videos on "thatistheplan". Fantano was criticized for the use of Pepe the Frog memes (which had recently been labeled an alt-right symbol) and targeting feminists. After the article was released, multiple scheduled dates of "The Needle Drop" U.S. tour were cancelled, with at least one ticket booking site for a Brooklyn tour date stating that their cancellation was due to the Fader article.

Fantano produced a video response calling the critical article a "hit job". He disputed accusations of sympathizing with the alt right and stated that the videos in question were satirical. The article was later deleted by The Fader, with both parties saying that the claims were settled. In a later interview, Fantano acknowledged that there had been some "grubby, closed-minded, young, aggressive male" viewers on the "thatistheplan" channel and disavowed what he saw as the "toxic and problematic" side of internet humor, stating that the incident had led him to be more vocal in his advocacy for social justice issues.

By the end of 2017, Fantano had reached a million subscribers and diversified his content to include weekly "track roundup" videos, livestreamed Q&As, and video think-pieces alongside his album reviews.

In June 2019, Fantano had a cameo in Lil Nas X's video for the Young Thug and Mason Ramsey remix of "Old Town Road", appearing as a security guard for the Area 51 military installation (a reference to the "Storm Area 51" meme). Later that year he curated a charity compilation, The Needle Drop LP, which consists of "artists that have either been featured on the site or reviewed favorably in the past". Profits from the album were donated to The Immigrant Legal Resource Center non-profit.

On September 15, 2022, Fantano uploaded a video on his second channel claiming that Canadian musician Drake had sent private messages to him on Instagram, specifically recommending Fantano a vegan cookie recipe. One day later, Drake revealed the actual contents of his message to Fantano on Instagram Stories as a diss against him. Fantano later revealed his astonishment on an Instagram livestream, going on to joke about the debacle.

Reception 
The Needle Drop won the 2011 O Music Awards in the "Beyond the Blog" category. In 2014, Nick Veronin of Wired said of Fantano "Instead of deploying ten-dollar words to describe a riff or synth tone, Fantano relies on gestures, clenching his fists or contorting his elastic, expressive face. It gets at some of the more ephemeral qualities of music that written words can't begin to touch."

When asked about the merits of Fantano's reviews, veteran music critic Robert Christgau said in 2019:
[Fantano] seems to have arrived at a plausible brand of 21st-century rockcrit taste that runs toward what I'll call dark prog [...] Nowhere near as insensible to hip-hop/r&b as dark proggers tend to be, but note that very few female artists crack his top 10s, which in 2018 was really missing the action. Fantano seems to have figured out a way to make some kind of living by disseminating his own criticism in the online age.
In his 2019 book Perfect Sound Whatever, comedian James Acaster called Fantano's best albums of 2016 list "a real music fan's Top 50" and said of Fantano "perhaps more than anybody else, he appreciates how the reviewer's role has changed since the internet became a thing [...] The job of a reviewer used to be telling people what's worth their money but now it's telling people what's worth their time." In September 2020, New York Times culture correspondent Joe Coscarelli described Fantano as "probably the most popular music critic left standing". According to Coscarelli, Fantano has successfully brought an "old art to a new medium" and has revitalized the record review format for a younger generation of music consumers.

Personal life 
Fantano resides in Connecticut. He is a vegan, having swapped to the diet after first going vegetarian in his late teens.

In March 2018, Fantano told Polygon that he is a "free speech purist". Fantano endorsed Bernie Sanders in the 2020 United States presidential election.

Discography 

Albums
Taiga (2009) 
Anthony FanFiction Vol.1 (2015)

Guest appearances
"21 & Jaded" on Never Forget Where You Came From by Goody Grace (2021) 
"Every Drug at Once" on FASTER by Lil Texas (2022)
"NeedleDrop" on Vinyl Days by Logic (2022)

as Cal Chuchesta 

Mixtapes
The New CALassic (2015)

Singles
"Cal 2 B" (2013)
"Mykey Come Back" (2015)
"Panda (Remix)" featuring Pink Guy and NFKRZ (2016)
"Coin Star" (2018)
"Don't Talk to Me" featuring Fellatia Geisha (2018)
"Slap Chop" (2018)
"On Deck Freestyle" (2018)
"I'm in the Club (Lookin' for Some Love)" featuring Joycie (2018)
"Advice" featuring Rob Scallon (2018)
"Rubber Duck (Pickup Truck)" (2019)
"Best Teef?" (2019)
"East (Remix)" (2020)

References

External links 

 
 
 

1985 births
21st-century American bass guitarists
21st-century American non-fiction writers
American people of Italian descent
American atheists
American male bloggers
American bloggers
American podcasters
American music critics
American music journalists
American social democrats
American YouTubers
Internet properties established in 2009
Living people
Musicians from Connecticut
Music YouTubers
People from Wolcott, Connecticut
Southern Connecticut State University alumni
Twitch (service) streamers
YouTube controversies
YouTube critics and reviewers
YouTube vloggers